AlsaceExel was an airline based in Strasbourg, France. It was part of the ExelAviation Group operating services from Strasbourg Airport to regional destinations in Europe.

History

The airline was established in March 2004 and started operations on March 28, 2004. The airline ceased services by the parent company on January 31, 2005.

Fleet
The AlsaceExel fleet consisted of the following aircraft:

See also
List of defunct airlines of France

References

External links

Defunct airlines of France
Airlines established in 2004
Airlines disestablished in 2005
ExelAviation